Scotinotylus tianschanicus is a species of sheet weaver found in Central Asia. It was described by Tanasevitch in 1989.

References

Linyphiidae
Spiders of Asia
Spiders described in 1989